Miresa habenichti is a moth species in the family of Limacodidae found in Mozambique.

This species has a wingspan of 34mm and a body length of 18mm and was named after its collector Mr. Habenicht from Delagoa Bay.

References

Endemic fauna of Mozambique
Limacodidae
Lepidoptera of Mozambique
Moths of Sub-Saharan Africa
Moths described in 1913